Hui Liangyu (
Xiao'erjing:  ; born October 1944) was a Vice Premier of the People's Republic of China in charge of agriculture.

Biography
Hui was born in Yushu, Jilin Province. He is a member of the Hui ethnic minority. Starting in 1969, he worked in a number of Chinese Communist Party and government positions, rising to full membership in the Politburo of the CCP Central Committee in November 2002. He was the CCP party chief in Jiangsu from 2000 to 2002. He served as a Vice Premier from 2003 to 2013.

References
 Hui Liangyu biography  (China Vitae)
 Hui Liangyu (People's Daily)

1944 births
Living people
Hui people
Politicians from Changchun
People's Republic of China politicians from Jilin
Vice Premiers of the People's Republic of China
Chinese Communist Party politicians from Jilin
Political office-holders in Anhui
Political office-holders in Jiangsu
Members of the 17th Politburo of the Chinese Communist Party
Members of the 16th Politburo of the Chinese Communist Party